Universal Health Services, Inc. (UHS) is an American Fortune 500 company that provides hospital and healthcare services, based in King of Prussia, Pennsylvania. In 2022, its annual revenues were $13.4 billion.

Company history
Alan B. Miller, who currently serves as the company's Executive Chairman, founded Universal Health Services, Inc. in 1979. Within 18 months of its founding, UHS owned four hospitals and had management contracts with two additional hospitals.

In 1979, UHS entered Las Vegas with the purchase of Valley Hospital.

In 1980, the company chose its first Board of Directors. In 1981, UHS held its initial public offering. In 1982, UHS purchased five hospitals from the Stewards Foundation, marking the first time a for-profit corporation purchased hospitals from a nonprofit religious organization. In 1983, UHS purchased Qualicare, Inc. for more than $116 million. The purchase included 11 acute care hospitals and four behavioral health hospitals. In 1986, UHS created Universal Health Realty Income Trust, the first REIT in the healthcare industry.

1991, UHS stock trading moved from NASDAQ to NYSE.

In November 2010, UHS reached an agreement in May to acquire Psychiatric Solutions, Inc. for $3,1 billion. In June 2012, UHS announced its plans to acquire Ascend Health Corporation for $517 million. In February 2014, UHS bought Palo Verde Mental Health for an undisclosed amount, renaming the facility to Palo Verde Behavioral Health. In April of that year, UHS announced the acquisition of the Psychiatric Institute of Washington. In September of that year, UHS' stock joined the S&P 500 Index and acquired Cygnet Health Care Limited for approximately $335 million. In August 2015, UHS acquired Alpha Hospitals Holdings Limited for $148 million from private equity group C&C Alpha Group. In September of that year, UHS announced the acquisition of Foundations Recovery Network based in Brentwood, Tennessee for $350 million. In August 2016, UHS bought Desert View Hospital in Pahrump, Nevada for an undisclosed amount. In December of that year, UHS acquired Cambian Group PLC's Adult Services Division. In July 2018, UHS announced its acquisition of the Danshell Group.

On September 28, 2020, Universal Health Services Inc. announced that its network went offline after an unspecified "IT security issue".

In September 2020, consistent with the company's long-standing succession plan, UHS announced that Alan B. Miller would step down as CEO in January 2021 and that President Marc D. Miller would be named CEO.

UHS ranked on the Fortune 500 in 2021 and 2022. 

UHS was named on the Fortune World's Most Admired List in 2020 and 2021.

UHS was again named on the Fortune World's Most Admired List 2023

Controversies

Hospital licenses
The Centers for Medicare and Medicaid Services (CMS) threatened the Rancho Springs Medical Center (Murrieta) and Inland Valley Regional Medical Center (Wildomar) in California with decertification in June 2010 while the State of California warned of a possible hospital license revocation.  Universal Health Services implemented a program to address all concerns and in November 2011 the two hospitals passed a CMS Certification Survey. As a result, CMS rescinded its termination notice and the California Department of Public Health withdrew its license revocation notice.

Allegations of noncompliance with same-sex visitation law
According to a petition started on change.org by Terri-Ann Simonelli of Henderson, Nevada, Spring Valley Hospital (owned and operated by UHS) claimed that their policy required power of attorney for a same-sex partner to make medical decisions on behalf of their partner. If true, this would seemingly violate new Department of Health and Human Services rules enabling same-sex partners to make said decisions, with or without power of attorney.

Fraudulent Medicaid claims
In September 2012, UHS and its subsidiaries, Keystone Education and Youth Services LLC and Keystone Marion LLC d/b/a Keystone Marion Youth Center agreed to pay over $6.9 million to resolve allegations that they submitted false and fraudulent claims to Medicaid. Between October 2004 and March 2010, the entities allegedly provided substandard psychiatric counseling and treatment to adolescents in violation of the Medicaid requirements. The United States alleged that UHS falsely represented Keystone Marion Youth Center as a residential treatment facility providing inpatient psychiatric services to Medicaid enrolled children, when in fact it was a juvenile detention facility. The United States further alleged that neither a medical director nor licensed psychiatrist provided the required direction for psychiatric services or for the development of initial or continuing treatment plans. The settlement further resolved allegations that the entities filed false records or statements to Medicaid when they filed treatment plans that falsely represented the level of services that would be provided to the patients.

On July 10, 2020, the US Department of Justice announced a $122 million Fraudulent Claims case with "Universal Health Services, Inc., UHS of Delaware, Inc.(together, UHS), and Turning Point Care Center, LLC (Turning Point), a UHS facility located in Moultrie, Georgia, have agreed to pay a combined total of $122 million to resolve alleged violations of the False Claims Act for billing for medically unnecessary inpatient behavioral health services, failing to provide adequate and appropriate services, and paying illegal inducements to federal healthcare beneficiaries." From the announcement: "The government alleged that, between January 2006, and December 2018, UHS’s facilities admitted federal healthcare beneficiaries who were not eligible for inpatient or residential treatment because their conditions did not require that level of care, while also failing to properly discharge appropriately admitted beneficiaries when they no longer required inpatient care. The government further alleged that UHS’s facilities billed for services not rendered, billed for improper and excessive lengths of stay, failed to provide adequate staffing, training, and/or supervision of staff, and improperly used physical and chemical restraints and seclusion. In addition, UHS’s facilities allegedly failed to develop and/or update individual assessments and treatment plans for patients, failed to provide adequate discharge planning, and failed to provide required individual and group therapy services in accordance with federal and state regulations.

Of the $117 million to be paid by UHS to resolve these claims, the federal government will receive a total of $88,124,761.27, and a total of $28,875,238.73 will be returned to individual states, which jointly fund state Medicaid programs."

Buzzfeed investigation
On December 7, 2016, BuzzFeed published a report detailing questionable practices within UHS psychiatric facilities.  The report includes allegations of holding nonthreatening patients against their will, manipulative misinterpretation of patient testimonies to fit guidelines to involuntary confinement, aggressive staff layoffs and understaffing in hospitals, needless patient deaths due to understaffing and misprescription of medication, "violating a patient’s right to be discharged or holding a patient without the proper documentation", and unnecessary extension of stay times to the maximum Medicare payout. UHS denied the conclusions of the report. UHS stock fell approximately 12% after publication.

According to Buzzfeed investigative reporter Rosalind Adams, UHS responded to the report by hiring "a global PR firm that offers specialized crisis management services... UHS didn't just implement a crisis PR plan. It also fired an employee that the company believed to have spoken to a reporter; it sued a former employee it alleges leaked damaging internal surveillance videos; it threatened to sue other employees; at least one facility held a series of town hall meetings to warn employees from speaking with us; it conducted “in-depth interviews” with nearly two dozen staff, then distributed a public apology that two of them signed; it enlisted one of the most powerful law firms in the United States; it built multiple, high-production-value websites specifically designed to overcome the reputational damage that our reporting might cause."

Cygnet Healthcare
A UK subsidiary, Cygnet Health Care, was the subject of a BBC investigation that found that staff had been taunting, provoking and scaring vulnerable people.   It runs 140 mental health services across the UK.  85% of its services are “rated good or outstanding by our regulators”.  New admissions were banned at Cygnet Acer clinic after the Care Quality Commission found it unsafe to use.  A patient hanged herself, others self harmed, ligature points were found where patients could hang themselves and too many of the staff were untrained to deal with the highly vulnerable patients at the clinic.

The company bought four inpatient units which were previously operated by the Danshell Group in 2018. All four were condemned by the Care Quality Commission which raised concerns about patients’ “unexplained injuries” and high levels of restraint in 2019.

Additional Allegations
On May 16, 2021, Detroit Free Press published an article exposing St. Simons By The Sea (formerly Focus By The Sea) in St. Simons Island, Georgia for recruiting patients from a local soup kitchen. St. Simons By The Sea contracts physician services with Southland MD in Thomasville, Georgia.

Hospitals and Centers

 Aiken Physicians Alliance, Aiken, South Carolina
 Aiken Regional Medical Center, Aiken, South Carolina
 Alabama Clinical Schools, Birmingham, Alabama
 Alliance Health Center, Meridian, Mississippi
 Anchor Hospital, Atlanta, Georgia
 Arbour Counseling Services, Fall River, Massachusetts
 Arbour Hospital, Boston, Massachusetts
 Arrowhead Behavioral Health, Maumee, Ohio
 Aurora Pavilion Behavioral Health Services: an extension of Aiken Regional Medical Center, Aiken, South Carolina
 Austin Oaks Hospital, Austin, Texas
 Behavioral Hospital of Bellaire, Houston, Texas
 Belmont Pines Hospital, Youngstown, Ohio
 Benchmark Behavioral Health System, Woods Cross, Utah
 BHC Alhambra Hospital, Rosemead, California
 Black Bear Lodge, Sautee Nacoochee, Georgia
 Bloomington Meadows Hospital, Bloomington, Indiana
 Brentwood Behavioral Healthcare/Brentwood Jackson, Flowood, Mississippi
 Brentwood Hospital, Shreveport, Louisiana
 Brooke Glen Behavioral Hospital, Fort Washington, Pennsylvania
 Brynn Marr Hospital, Jacksonville, North Carolina
 Calvary Healing Center, Phoenix, Arizona
 Cancer Care Institute of Carolina: an extension of Aiken Regional Medical Center, Aiken, South Carolina
 Canyon Creek Behavioral Health, Temple, Texas
 Canyon Ridge Hospital, Chino, California
 Cedar Creek Hospital, St. Johns, Michigan
 Cedar Grove Residential Treatment Center, Murfreesboro, Tennessee 
 Cedar Hills Hospital, Beaverton, Oregon
 Cedar Ridge Behavioral Hospital/Cedar Ridge Residential Treatment, Oklahoma City, Oklahoma
 Cedar Ridge Behavioral Hospital at Bethany/Bethany Behavioral Health, Bethany, Oklahoma
 Cedar Springs Hospital, Colorado Springs, Colorado
 Centennial Hills Hospital Medical Center: an extension of Valley Health System Las Vegas, Nevada
 Centennial Peaks Hospital, Louisville, Colorado
 Center for Change, Orem, Utah
 Central Florida Behavioral Hospital, Orlando, Florida
 Chris Kyle Patriots Hospital: an extension of North Star Behavioral Health System, Anchorage, Alaska
 Clarion Psychiatric Center, Clarion, Pennsylvania
 Clive Behavioral Health: an extension of MercyOne, Clive, Iowa
 Coastal Behavioral Health/Coastal Harbor Residential Treatment Center, Savannah, Georgia
 Columbus Behavioral Center for Children and Adolescents, Columbus, Indiana
 Compass Intervention Center, Memphis, Tennessee
 Cooper Hills Youth Center, West Jordan, Utah
 Coral Shores Behavioral Health, Stuart, Florida
 Cornerstone Regional Hospital: an extension of South Texas Health System, Edinburg, Texas 
 Corona Regional Medical Center, Corona, California
 Cumberland Hall Hospital, Hopkinsville, Kentucky
 Cumberland Hospital for Children and Adolescents, New Kent, Virginia
 Cypress Creek Hospital, Houston, Texas
 Debarr Residential Treatment Center & The Cascade Trail at Alpine Academy: an extension of North Star Behavioral Health System, Anchorage, Alaska
 Del Amo Behavioral Health System, Torrance, California
 Desert Springs Hospital Medical Center, Las Vegas, Nevada
 Desert View Hospital: an extension of Valley Health System, Pahrump, Nevada
 Diamond Grove Center/Diamond Grove Center for Children, Louisville, Mississippi
 Doctors Hospital Emergency Room Saunders, Laredo, Texas
 Doctors Hospital Emergency Room South, Laredo, Texas
 Dover Behavioral Health System, Dover, Delaware
 El Paso Behavioral Health System, El Paso, Texas
 Emerald Coast Behavioral Hospital, Panama City, Florida
 ER at Anna: an extension of Texoma Medical Center, Anna, Texas
 ER at Blue Diamond: an Extension of Spring Valley Hospital, Las Vegas, Nevada
 ER at Fruitville: an extension of Lakewood Ranch Medical Center, Sarasota, Florida
 ER at Green Valley Ranch: an extension of Henderson Hospital, Henderson, Nevada
 ER at McCarran NW: an extension of Nevada Medical Center, Reno, Nevada
 ER at Sherman: an extension of Texoma Medical Center, Sherman, Texas
 ER at Westlake: an extension of Wellington Regional Medical Center, Westlake, Florida
 Fairfax Behavioral Health, Kirkland, Washington
 Fairmount Behavioral Health System, Philadelphia, Pennsylvania
 First Home Care - Central/Richmond: Virginia Therapeutic Foster Care Services, Richmond, Virginia
 First Home Care - Roanoke: Virginia Therapeutic Foster Care Services, Roanoke, Virginia
 First Home Care - Tidewater: Virginia  Therapeutic Foster Care Services, Portsmouth, Virginia
 First Home Care - Northern Virginia: Virginia Therapeutic Foster Care Services, Alexandria, Virginia
 Forest View Hospital, Grand Rapids, Michigan
 Fort Duncan Regional Medical Center, Eagle Pass, Texas
 Fort Lauderdale Behavioral Health Center, Oakland Park, Florida
 Foundations Atlanta at Midtown, Atlanta, Georgia
 Foundations Behavioral Health, Doylestown, Pennsylvania
 Foundations for Living Residential Treatment Center for Youth, Mansfield, Ohio
 Foundations Memphis/The Oaks at Lakeside Behavioral Health System, Memphis, Tennessee
 Foundations San Francisco, San Francisco, California
 Fox Run Center for Children and Adolescents: an extension of Kempsville Center For Behavioral Health, Saint Clairsville, Ohio
 Fremont Hospital, Fremont, California
 Friends Hospital, Philadelphia, Pennsylvania
 Fuller Hospital: an extension of Fremont Hospital, South Attleboro, Massachusetts
 Garfield Park Behavioral Hospital, Chicago, Illinois
 Garland Behavioral Hospital, Garland, Texas
 Glen Oaks Hospital, Greenville, Texas
 Gulf Coast Treatment Center, Fort Walton Beach, Florida
 Gulfport Behavioral Health System, Gulfport, Mississippi
 Hampton Behavioral Health Center, Westampton, New Jersey
 Harbor Point Behavioral Health Center, Portsmouth, Virginia
 Hartgrove Behavioral Health System, Chicago, Illinois
 Havenwyck Hospital: an extension of Glen Oaks Hospital, Auburn Hills, Michigan
 Heartland Behavioral Health Services, Nevada, Missouri
 Henderson Hospital: an extension of Valley Health System, Henderson, Nevada
 Heritage Oaks Hospital, Sacramento, California 
 Hermitage Hall, Nashville, Tennessee
 Hickory Trail Hospital Behavioral Health Services, DeSoto, Texas
 Highlands Behavioral Health System, Littleton, Colorado
 Hill Crest Behavioral Health Services, Birmingham, Alabama
 Holly Hill Hospital, Raleigh, North Carolina
 Hospital Panamericano, Cidra, Puerto Rico
 HRI Hospital: an extension of Kempsville Center for Behavioral Health, Brookline, Massachusetts
 Inland Northwest Behavioral Health, Spokane, Washington
 Inland Valley Medical Center: an extension of Southwest Healthcare System, Wildomar, California
 Innovations Academy, Streamwood, Illinois
 Intermountain Hospital, Boise, Idaho
 Kempsville Center for Behavioral Health, Portsmouth, Virginia
 KeyStone Center, Chester, Pennsylvania
 Kingwood Pines Hospital, Houston, Texas
 La Amistad Behavioral Health Services, Maitland, Florida
 Lakeside Behavioral Health System, Memphis, Tennessee
 Lakewood Ranch Medical Center, Bradenton, Florida
 Lancaster Behavioral Health Hospital: an extension of Penn Medicine Lancaster General Health/Lancaster Behavioral Health Hospital, Lancaster, Pennsylvania
 Laredo Physicians Group, Laredo, Texas
 Laurel Heights Hospital, Atlanta, Georgia
 Laurel Oaks Behavioral Health Center, Dothan, Alabama
 Laurel Ridge Treatment Center: an extension of Laurel Heights Hospital, San Antonio, Texas
 Liberty Point Behavioral Healthcare, Staunton, Virginia
 Lighthouse Behavioral Health Hospital, Conway, South Carolina
 Lighthouse Care Center of Augusta, Augusta, Georgia
 Lincoln Prairie Behavioral Health Center, Springfield, Illinois
 Lincoln Trail Behavioral Health System, Radcliff, Kentucky
 Manatee Diagnostic Center, Arcadia, Florida
 Manatee Diagnostic Center, Parrish, Florida
 Manatee Diagnostic Center Point West, Bradenton, Florida
 Manatee Diagnostic Center Riverside, Bradenton, Florida
 Manatee Healthcare System, Bradenton, Florida
 Manatee Memorial Hospital, Bradenton, Florida
 Manatee Physician Alliance, Bradenton, Florida
 Mayhill Hospital, Denton, Texas
 McDowell Center for Children, Dyersburg, Tennessee
 Meridell Achievement Center, Liberty Hill, Texas
 Mesilla Valley Hospital, Las Cruces, New Mexico
 Michael’s House Outpatient: an extension of Foundations Recovery Network, Palm Springs, California
 Michiana Behavioral Health, Plymouth, Indiana
 Midwest Center for Youth and Families: an extension of Psychiatric Institute of Washington, Kouts, Indiana
 Millwood Hospital, Arlington, Texas
 Mountain Youth Academy, Mountain City, Tennessee
 Natchez Trace Youth Academy, Waverly, Tennessee
 Newport News Behavioral Health Center, Newport News, Virginia
 North Springs Behavioral Healthcare, Leesburg, Virginia
 North Star Hospital, Anchorage, Alaska
 Northern Nevada Medical Center, Sparks, Nevada
 Northern Nevada Medical Group, Sparks, Nevada
 Northwest Emergency at Town Square: an extension of Northwest Texas Healthcare System, Amarillo, Texas
 Northwest Emergency on Georgia: an extension of Texas Healthcare System, Amarillo, Texas
 Northwest Texas Healthcare System, Amarillo, Texas
 Northwest Texas Physician Group: an extension of Northwest Texas Healthcare System, Amarillo, Texas
 Oak Plains Academy, Ashland City, Tennessee
 Okaloosa Youth Academy/Gulf Coast Youth Services, Crestview, Florida
 Old Vineyard Behavioral Health Services, Winston-Salem, North Carolina
 Palm Point Behavioral Health Center, Titusville, Florida
 Palm Shores Behavioral Health Center, Bradenton, Florida
 Palmdale Regional Medical Center, Palmdale, California
 Palmer Residential Treatment Center: an extension of North Star Behavioral Health System, Palmer, Alaska
 Palmetto Lowcountry Behavioral Health, Charleston, South Carolina
 Palmetto Summerville Behavioral Health, Summerville, South Carolina
 Palms Westside Clinic ASC/Palms Wellington Surgical Center, Royal Palm Beach, Florida
 Palo Verde Behavioral Health, Tucson, Arizona
 Parkwood Behavioral Health System, Olive Branch, Mississippi
 Peachford Hospital, Atlanta, Georgia
 Pembroke Hospital, Pembroke, Massachusetts
 Pinnacle Point Behavioral Healthcare System/The Point, Little Rock, Arkansas
 Pinnacle Point Hospital, Little Rock, Arkansas 
 Poplar Springs Hospital, Petersburg, Virginia
 Prairie St. John’s, Fargo, North Dakota
 Pride Institute, Eden Prairie, Minnesota
 Provo Canyon Behavioral Hospital, Orem, Utah
 Provo Canyon School, Provo, Utah
 Provo Canyon School Springville Campus, Springville, Utah
 Psychiatric Institute of Washington, Washington, D.C.
 Quail Run Behavioral Health, Phoenix, Arizona
 Quail Surgical and Pain Management Center, Reno, Nevada
 Rancho Springs Medical Center: an extension of Southwest Healthcare System, Murrieta, California
 Reasons Eating Disorder Center: an extension of BHC Alhambra Hospital, Rosemead, California
 Rivendell Behavioral Health Hospital, Bowling Green, Kentucky
 River Crest Hospital, San Angelo, Texas
 River Oaks Hospital, New Orleans, Louisiana
 River Park Hospital, Huntington, West Virginia
 River Point Behavioral Health, Jacksonville, Florida
 Riveredge Hospital, Forest Park, Illinois
 Rockford Center, Newark, Delaware]
 Rolling Hills Hospital, Franklin, Tennessee
 Roxbury Treatment Center, Shippensburg, Pennsylvania
 Salt Lake Behavioral Health, Salt Lake City, Utah
 San Marcos Treatment Center: an extension of KI Charter Academy, San Marcos, Texas
 SandyPines Hospital/SandyPines Residential Treatment Center, Tequesta, Florida 
 Sierra Vista Hospital, Sacramento, California 
 Skywood Recovery Outpatient at Royal Oak: an extension of Foundations Recovery Network, Royal Oak, Michigan
 Skywood Recovery, Augusta, Michigan
 South Texas Health System Bariatric Weight Loss Surgery Center, McAllen, Texas
 South Texas Health System Behavioral, Edinburg, Texas
 South Texas Health System Children’s, Edinburg, Texas
 South Texas Health System Clinics, McAllen, Texas
 South Texas Health System Edinburg, Edinburg, Texas
 South Texas Health System ER Alamo, Alamo, Texas
 South Texas Health System ER McColl, Edinburg, Texas
 South Texas Health System ER Mission, Mission, Texas
 South Texas Health System ER Monte Cristo, Edinburg, Texas
 South Texas Health System ER Ware Road, McAllen, Texas
 South Texas Health System ER Weslaco, Weslaco, Texas
 South Texas Health System Heart/McAllen Heart Hospital, McAllen, Texas
 South Texas Health System Physical Rehabilitation Unit, Edinburg, Texas
 Southeast Behavioral Hospital/Southeast Behavioral Health: an extension of Southeast Health, Cape Girardeau, Missouri
 Southern California Physician Network, Temecula, California
 Spring Mountain Sahara, Las Vegas, Nevada
 Spring Mountain Treatment Center, Las Vegas, Nevada
 Spring Valley Hospital Medical Center: an extension of Valley Health System, Las Vegas, Nevada
 Springwoods Behavioral Health, Fayetteville, Arkansas
 St. Louis Behavioral Medicine Institute, St. Louis, Missouri 
 St. Mary’s Physician Associates, Enid, Oklahoma
 St. Mary’s Regional Medical Center, Enid, Oklahoma
 St. Simons By The Sea, St. Simons Island, Georgia
 Stonington Institute, North Stonington, Connecticut
 Streamwood Behavioral Healthcare System/Streamwood Hospital, Streamwood, Illinois
 Summerlin Valley Hospital Medical Center: an extension of Valley Health System, Las Vegas, Nevada
 Summit Oaks Hospital, Summit, New Jersey
 SummitRidge Hospital Behavioral Health Services, Lawrenceville, Georgia
 Suncoast Behavioral Health Center, Bradenton, Florida
 Surgery Center of Aiken: an extension of Aiken Regional Medical Center, Aiken, South Carolina
 Talbott Recovery/Talbott Campus: an extension of Foundations Recovery Network, Atlanta, Georgia
 Talbott Recovery Dunwoody/Talbott Campus: an extension of Foundations Recovery Network, Dunwoody, Georgia 
 Temecula Valley Day Surgery and Pain Therapy Center, Murrieta, California
 Temecula Valley Hospital, Temecula, California 
 Texas NeuroRehab Center, Austin, Texas
 Texoma Medical Center, Denison, Texas
 TexomaCare, Denison, Texas
 The Bridgeway, North Little Rock, Arkansas 
 The Brook Hospital - Dupont: an The Pavilion Behavioral Health System, Louisville, Kentucky 
 The Brook Hospital - KMI: an extension of The Pavilion Behavioral Health System, Louisville, Kentucky 
 The Canyon at Santa Monica: an extension of Foundations Recovery Network, Los Angeles, California 
 The Carolina Center for Behavioral Health, Greer, South Carolina
 The George Washington University Hospital, Washington, D.C. (since 1997)
 The Horsham Clinic, Ambler, Pennsylvania 
 The Hughes Center for Exceptional Children, Danville, Virginia 
 The Meadows Psychiatric Center, Centre Hall, Pennsylvania 
 The Pavilion Behavioral Health System/Pavilion Hospital, Champaign, Illinois 
 The Point Behavioral Health Services/The Point: an extension of The Pavilion Behavioral Health System/Pavilion Hospital, Bryant, Arkansas
 The Recovery Center Texas, Wichita Falls, Texas
 The Ridge Behavioral Health System, Lexington, Kentucky
 The Vines Hospital, Ocala, Florida 
 Three Rivers Behavioral Health, West Columbia, South Carolina
 Three Rivers Midlands, West Columbia, South Carolina
 TMC Behavioral Health, Sherman, Texas
 Turning Point Care Center/Turning Point Hospital, Moultrie, Georgia
 University Behavioral Center, Orlando, Florida 
 Valle Vista Health Center, Greenwood, Indiana
 Valley Health Physician Alliance, Las Vegas, Nevada 
 Valley Hospital Mental Health and Chemical Dependency Care, Phoenix, Arizona 
 Valley Hospital Medical Center: an extension of Valley Health System, Las Vegas, Nevada 
 Wekiva Springs Center, Jacksonville, Florida
Wellington Regional, Wellington, Florida
Windmoor Healthcare, Clearwater, Florida

References

External links
 
 
 Universal Health Services recipient profile on USAspending.gov
 UHS Behind Closed Doors from the Service Employees International Union

1979 establishments in Pennsylvania
American companies established in 1979
Companies listed on the New York Stock Exchange
Health care companies based in Pennsylvania
Hospital networks in the United States
Companies based in Montgomery County, Pennsylvania